Palaeosyops (Greek: "old" (paleos), "boar" (kapros), "face" (ops)) is a genus of small brontothere which lived during the early to middle Eocene.

Biology and size

It was about the size of small cattle, with a weight of 600–800 kg depending on the species.

These animals are commonly found in Wyoming fossil beds primarily as fossilized teeth. From all of the species of this animal, it is concluded that P. major was the largest, reaching the size of a small cow. Its describer, Joseph Leidy, erroneously thought that Palaeosyops consumed both plants and animals after examining the fang-like canines. However, it is now known that all brontotheres were strict herbivores, and that many, if not most genera of hornless brontotheres had fang-like canines, possibly for both defense from predators, and intraspecific competition.

References

External links
 Academy of Natural Sciences

Brontotheres
Eocene mammals of North America
Prehistoric placental genera